Bobby Brooks (born March 3, 1976) is a former professional American football player who played linebacker for three seasons for the Oakland Raiders and Jacksonville Jaguars

References

1976 births
American football linebackers
Oakland Raiders players
Jacksonville Jaguars players
Fresno State Bulldogs football players
Living people